James Woodhouse (17 November 1770, Philadelphia – 4 June 1809, Philadelphia) was an American surgeon and chemist.

Biography
He was the son of English emigrants to the United States. He graduated from the University of Pennsylvania in 1787, and from its medical department in 1792. In 1791 he served as a surgeon in General Arthur St. Clair's expedition against the western Indians. When Joseph Priestley declined to accept the chair of chemistry at the University of Pennsylvania in 1795, Woodhouse received the appointment, which he held until his death.

He is said to have been the first to demonstrate the superiority of the Lehigh anthracite coal in Northampton County, Pennsylvania, over the bituminous coals of Virginia for intensity and regularity of heating power. He also studied potassium, nitrous oxide, identification of basalt, starch and bread making. He was a member of the American Philosophical Society, and contributed to its transactions, to Samuel L. Mitchell's Medical Repository, and to John R. Coxe's Medical Museum.

Publications
 Dissertation on the Chemical and Medical Properties of the Persimmon-Tree (1792)
 Observations on the Combinations of Acids, Bitters, and Astringents (1793)
 Answer to Dr. J. Priestley's Considerations on the Doctrine of Phlogiston and the Decomposition of Water (1794)
 Young Chemist's Pocket-Companion (1797)
 Experiments and Observations in the Vegetation of Plants (1802)
He edited:
 Parkinson, Chemical Pocket-Book (Philadelphia, 1802)
 Chaptal, Elements of Chemistry (4th ed., 2 vols., 1807)

Notes

References

Further reading
 

1770 births
1809 deaths
19th-century American chemists
Scientists from Philadelphia
University of Pennsylvania faculty
University of Pennsylvania alumni
People of colonial Pennsylvania
American people of English descent
Members of the American Philosophical Society
Perelman School of Medicine at the University of Pennsylvania alumni
Physicians from Philadelphia